The 2000–01 La Liga season, the 70th since its establishment, started on 9 September 2000 and finished on 17 June 2001.

Teams 
Twenty teams competed in the league – the top seventeen teams from the previous season and the three teams promoted from the Segunda División. The promoted teams were Las Palmas, Osasuna and Villarreal, returning to the top flight after an absence of twelve, six and one years respectively. They replaced Betis, Atlético Madrid and Sevilla, ending their top flight spells of six, sixty six and one year respectively.

Team information

Clubs and locations 

2000–01 season was composed of the following clubs:

(*) Promoted from Segunda División

League table

Results

Overall 
 Most wins – Real Madrid (24)
 Fewest wins – Valladolid and Zaragoza (9)
 Most draws – Valladolid and Zaragoza (15)
 Fewest draws – Deportivo La Coruña, Alavés and Las Palmas (7)
 Most losses – Real Oviedo, Racing Santander and Numancia (19)
 Fewest losses – Real Madrid (6)
 Most goals scored – Real Madrid (81)
 Fewest goals scored – Numancia (40)
 Most goals conceded – Real Sociedad and Rayo Vallecano (68)
 Fewest goals conceded – Valencia (34)

Awards

Pichichi Trophy 

The Pichichi Trophy is awarded to the player who scores the most goals in a season.

Fair Play award 
Real Madrid was the winner of the Fair-play award with 86 points, second was Espanyol and third Zaragoza.

Pedro Zaballa award 
Manolo Hidalgo, Atlético Madrid footballer, making the same action as Pedro Zaballa

Signings 
Source: http://www.bdfutbol.com/es/t/t2000-01.html

See also 
 2000–01 Segunda División
 2000–01 Copa del Rey

References 

La Liga seasons
1
Spain